Aminoethylpiperazine is a derivative of piperazine. This ethyleneamine contains three nitrogen atoms; one primary, one secondary and one tertiary.
It is a corrosive liquid and can cause second or third degree burns. Aminoethylpiperazine can also cause pulmonary edema as a result of inhalation.

Uses
Uses include inhibition of corrosion, epoxy curing, surface activation, and as an asphalt additive. When used as an epoxy resin curing agent, it is usually used in conjunction with other amines as an accelerator as it only has 3 amine hydrogens for cross-linking.

See also 
Piperazine

External links 
Catalytic method for the conjoint manufacture of N-aminoethylpiperazine
Safety MSDS Data
Safety data sheet
Data sheet

Piperazines
Ethyleneamines